Luca Celli (born February 23, 1979, in Forlimpopoli) is an Italian former professional cyclist.

Major results
2004
 5th Châteauroux Classic
2005
 1st  Overall Tour de Wallonie
1st Stage 1
2007
 2nd Overall Rheinland-Pfalz Rundfahrt
1st Stage 3 
 4th National Time Trial Championships
 8th Gran Premio Bruno Beghelli
2008
 2nd National Time Trial Championships
 2nd Coppa Bernocchi
 7th Giro di Romagna
 9th Memorial Marco Pantani
 10th Overall Tour of Belgium

References

1979 births
Living people
Italian male cyclists
Sportspeople from the Province of Forlì-Cesena
Cyclists from Emilia-Romagna